Thomas Bruce McEwen  (born 10 May 1991) is a British equestrian who competes in eventing.

Tom was on the European young rider eventing team in 2010 and 2011. He won team gold in 2010 riding Major Sweep and then won another team gold in 2011 aboard Private Rudolph. He was a member of the gold medal-winning pony European eventing team in 2007 with his ride Dick Taytoe.

He competed at the 2018 World Equestrian Games upon Toledo de Kerser, finishing 12th individually and helping Team GBR win the team Gold. In 2019 he won the CCI***** event the  Étoiles de Pau riding Toldeo De Kerser.

Tom and Toledo De Kerser were selected to represent Britain at the delayed 2020 Summer Olympics and won gold in the team event.

McEwen was presented with an MBEMember of the Order of the British Empire (MBE) in the 2022 New Year Honours for services to equestrianism.

CCI5* Results

References

1991 births
Living people
British male equestrians
British event riders
Equestrians at the 2020 Summer Olympics
Medalists at the 2020 Summer Olympics
Olympic equestrians of Great Britain
Olympic medalists in equestrian
Olympic gold medallists for Great Britain
Olympic silver medallists for Great Britain
Members of the Order of the British Empire